Victor Crivoi (born 25 May 1982) is a Romanian former tennis player. His career high ranking is No. 75, achieved on 17 August 2009. In 2005, he played in the International Tennis Federation's Professional Circuit and won seven titles. As a result, he was named the ITF's "Player Of The Year" for 2005. At the end of 2005, he was ranked No. 269 by the ATP, up from No. 488 at the year's start.

In the 2009 Internazionali BNL d'Italia, as a qualifier, he beat 14th seed James Blake 7–5, 6–3 in the first round; he then lost to Robin Söderling.

He qualified for the 2009 French Open. He lost to Gaël Monfils in the second round.

ATP Challenger Tour singles finals

Wins (1)

Runners-ups (8)

References

External links

 
 
 

1982 births
Living people
Romanian male tennis players
21st-century Romanian people